Joseph Roger O'Donnell (May 7, 1922 – August 9, 2007) was an American documentarian, photojournalist and a photographer for the United States Information Agency.

Life
Born in Johnstown, Pennsylvania, his most famous work was documenting photographically the immediate aftermath of the atomic bomb explosions at Nagasaki and Hiroshima, Japan, in 1945 and 1946 as a Marine photographer. The iconic "The boy standing by the crematory" is one of his works.

He died in Nashville, Tennessee.

Controversy
A controversy followed the printing of his obituary in the press. Some of the photographs that had been attributed to O'Donnell were actually shot by other photographers. A photograph of a saluting John F. Kennedy Jr. during the funeral for his father in 1963 was taken by Stan Stearns for United Press International, not by O'Donnell. O'Donnell also claimed credit for a photograph showing Stalin, Roosevelt and Churchill during a wartime meeting in Tehran, Iran, in 1943, but O'Donnell is not known to have been in Tehran at the time.

O'Donnell's son Tyge O'Donnell attributes some of the instances of his father's taking credit for others' work to the onset of dementia in the 1990s.

References

External links
AP article on the photo controversy by Travis Loller
The Times Obituary
 Japan 1945--A U.S. Marine’s Photographs from Ground Zero, photos by Joe O'Donnell Nashville: Vanderbilt University Press, 2005.
"Historical and Cultural Context for Joe O’Donnell’s Japan 1945: A U.S. Marine’s Photographs from Ground Zero." Presentation by John Frank, Center Grove, Indiana
Info from a pending documentary of Joe O'Donnell by David Tower
Editor & Publisher article on the obituary controversy by Greg Mitchell
"Post-war photos from Japan in 1945 opens at AMSE" Announcement for 2013 Smithsonian Institution photo exhibition, published February 13.
Clark Hoyt, "Pictures Worth a Thousand Questions", New York Times, September 16, 2007

American photojournalists
Photography in Japan
People from Johnstown, Pennsylvania
1922 births
2007 deaths
Journalists from Pennsylvania
20th-century American journalists
American male journalists